Mlungisi Bali (1 June 1990 – 3 January 2018) was a South African rugby union player that played first class rugby for the  in 2013 and 2014, and also represented the South Africa Under-20 at the 2010 IRB Junior World Championship. His regular position was lock.

Career

Youth

He was selected in the ' Under–18 Craven Week side in 2007 (which led to him being named in a South African Schools Academy side that faced the South African Schools side) and in 2008 (which led to his inclusion in the main South African Schools side).

He played for the  side in the 2008 and 2009 Under-19 Provincial Championships and for the  side in the 2010 Under-21 Provincial Championship. In 2010, he was selected for the South Africa Under-20 side that played at the 2010 IRB Junior World Championship in Argentina. He was an unused reserve in their first match against Tonga, but started in their 73–0 victory over Scotland. He played off the bench in their remaining three matches – the final pool stage match against Australia, their 36–7 semi-final defeat to eventual winners New Zealand and their third-place play-off match against England.

Griffons

He made a total of six appearances in the competition and the same amount in the 2014 Vodacom Cup, all of them from the start.

Death

Bali was the victim of a stabbing incident at a traditional homecoming ceremony in Mdantsane in December 2017. He was admitted to Frere Hospital in East London, where he died from his injuries on 3 January 2018, aged 27.

References

1990 births
2018 deaths
Deaths by stabbing in South Africa
Griffons (rugby union) players
People murdered in South Africa
Rugby union flankers
Rugby union locks
Rugby union players from East London, Eastern Cape
South Africa Under-20 international rugby union players
South African rugby union players
Xhosa people
South African murder victims
Male murder victims